First Story is Sayuri Sugawara's first album, released on January 27, 2010. The track 'Kimi ga Iru Kara' was used as the Japanese main theme for Final Fantasy XIII.

Track listings

CD

DVD
 Koi (SUGAWARA SAYURI Special Live)
 I still love you  (SUGAWARA SAYURI Special Live)
 Kimi ni Okuru Uta (SUGAWARA SAYURI Special Live)
 Kimi ga Iru Kara (music video)

References

External links
Official site

Sayuri Sugawara albums
2010 debut albums